The 1999 Jigawa State gubernatorial election occurred in Nigeria on January 9, 1999. The APP nominee Ibrahim Saminu Turaki won the election, defeating the PDP candidate.

Ibrahim Saminu Turaki emerged APP candidate.

Electoral system
The Governor of Jigawa State is elected using the plurality voting system.

Primary election

APP primary
The APP primary election was won by Ibrahim Saminu Turaki.

Results
The total number of registered voters in the state was 1,568,423. Total number of votes cast was 540,764 while number of valid votes was 540,764. Rejected votes were 0.

References 

Jigawa State gubernatorial elections
Jigawa State gubernatorial election
Jigawa State gubernatorial election
Jigawa State gubernatorial election